Paul Hardy may refer to:

Paul Hardy (born 1942), American attorney
Paul Hardy (baseball) (1910–1979), American baseball catcher
Paul Hardy (illustrator) (1862–1942), English illustrator